The Tym is a river in Krasnoyarsk Krai and Tomsk Oblast in Russia, right tributary of the Ob. The Tym freezes up in October to early November and stays icebound until late April to May. It is navigable within  of its estuary.

References

Rivers of Krasnoyarsk Krai
Rivers of Tomsk Oblast